Bone morphogenetic protein receptor type-1B also known as CDw293 (cluster of differentiation w293) is a protein that in humans is encoded by the BMPR1B gene.

Function 

BMPR1B is a member of the bone morphogenetic protein (BMP) receptor family of transmembrane serine/threonine kinases. The ligands of this receptor are BMPs, which are members of the TGF-beta superfamily. BMPs are involved in endochondral bone formation and embryogenesis. These proteins transduce their signals through the formation of heteromeric complexes of 2 different types of serine (threonine) kinase receptors: type I receptors of about 50-55 kD and type II receptors of about 70-80 kD. Type II receptors bind ligands in the absence of type I receptors, but they require their respective type I receptors for signaling, whereas type I receptors require their respective type II receptors for ligand binding.

The BMPR1B receptor plays a role in the formation of middle and proximal phalanges.

Clinical significance 

Mutations in this gene have been associated with primary pulmonary hypertension.

In the chick embryo, it has been shown that BMPR1B is found in precartilaginous condensations. BMPR1B is the major transducer of signals in these condensations as demonstrated in experiments using constitutively active BMPR1B receptors. BMPR1B is a more effective transducer of GDF5 than BMPR1A. Unlike BMPR1A null mice, which die at an early embryonic stage, BMPR1B null mice are viable.

References

External links
 
 

Bone morphogenetic protein
Clusters of differentiation
GS domain
Receptors
Transmembrane receptors
S/T domain
EC 2.7.11